Phillip Lowe (born December 16, 1958) is an American politician. He is a member of the South Carolina House of Representatives from the 60th District, serving since 2007. He is a member of the Republican party.

References

External links 

Living people
1958 births
Republican Party members of the South Carolina House of Representatives
21st-century American politicians